The 1946 SMU Mustangs football team was an American football team that represented Southern Methodist University (SMU) as a member of the Southwest Conference (SWC) during the 1946 college football season. In their ninth season under head coach Matty Bell, the Mustangs compiled a 4–5–1 record (2–4 against conference opponents) and outscored opponents by a total of 114 to 100. The team played its home games at Ownby Stadium in the University Park suburb of Dallas.

End Gene Wilson and guard Jim Sid Wright received first-team honors from the Associated Press (AP) and United Press (UP) on the 1946 All-Southwest Conference football team.

Schedule

After the season

The 1947 NFL Draft was held on December 16, 1946. The following Mustangs were selected.

References

SMU
SMU Mustangs football seasons
SMU Mustangs football